SMKA Tun Hajah Rahah or Tun Hajah Rahah Religious National Secondary School is a Malaysia educational institution established in 1982. The institution is located at Pekan Simpang Lima, Sungai Besar in the District of Sabak Bernam, Selangor, Malaysia.

History

Foundation
In 1979, the Ministry of Education under the Division of Technical and Vocational and the Selangor State Education Department were planning to build a vocational school for agriculture in Selangor. The development was financed by a special facilities loan for education development from the World Bank. The site selection was based on the factors that the land was an undeveloped state-owned land.

SMK Simpang Lima
The school was named Simpang Lima after a penta-junction at Jalan Kuala Selangor Lama near Sungai Nibong village. The construction completed in 1982 and the school was finally opened for admission in January 1982. However, due to political and public pressure, it was established as SMK Simpang Lima, a public secondary school and not as a vocational school as per planned.

SMKA Simpang Lima
After six years of service, there was a move by the school's Parent-Teacher Association with recommendation from the District Education Office of Sabak Bernam, to elevate the school status into a religious boarding school.

This proposal was accepted by the Ministry of Education and the Selangor Education Department. In 1988, the school's name was officially changed from SMK Simpang Lima to SMKA Simpang Lima.

SMKA Sabak Bernam
In 2015, the school was rebranded as SMKA Sabak Bernam to represent the whole district of Sabak Bernam.

SMKA Tun Rahah 
In 2016, the school was rebranded as SMKA Tun Rahah

Development 
At its opening, the school was made up of 1 double-storey block for administration, 3 double-storey blocks for classrooms, 1 single-storey block for laboratories and workshop, 8 medium quarters for teachers and school staff, and a canteen. When the school gradually evolved into a boarding school, one of the classroom blocks was converted into a hostel.

In 1992, the school received 4 new three-storey hostel block and a dining hall. In the same year, with the effort from the PTA and the local communities, a new surau was built.

In 1998, under the Sixth Malaysia Plan (RMK6), the Ministry of Education approved another construction of one three-storey classroom block and two three-storey hostel blocks, a new dining hall for female students, a water tank and two new playing court.

In 2002, the school received a new Multipurpose Hall and a new shuttle bus.

In 2004, the new one storey Computer Laboratories block completed.

In 2008, the school received a Class C Quarters for Headmaster residence and a new block next to the Multipurpose Hall.

Head Teachers

Symbols

Emblem

The school's emblem was introduced and has been used since the school's establishment in 1983. The design of the emblem did not undergo any major or significant change during the upgrading of SMK Simpang Lima into SMKA Simpang Lima and pursuant to the rebranding of SMKA Simpang Lima as SMKA Sabak Bernam. The school's management might have decided to incorporate the original emblem together with the motto "Disiplin Teras Kejayaan" into the identity of the new School. The only modification made are the color of the torch at the center of the emblem was changed from blue to green colour and the former school's name was replaced with the new one.

Colors and Elements

The emblem was made of five major colors and seven elements, each to represents unique quality or identity of the school.

Flag

Anthem

The school anthem was written by Madam Ustazah Latifah binti Abdullah in Arabic. The title of this song is "Madrasatuna"; meaning "My School." Students and teachers will sing this song on weekly assembly and annual events.

Yearbook

The school's annual magazine is called "Al-Hidayah" which means "The Right Way". Articles are contributed by the student and teachers. The magazine reports the school's activities for the year, club activities, official school functions, news about teachers and students and class photos.

Syllabus

Curricular

Extra-Curricular

Facilities

Gallery

School Emblem

See also

 Education in Malaysia
 Religious National Boarding School
 Sungai Besar

References

External links 
 
 SMKA Simpang Lima Alumni - Alumni Association
 Official SMKA Simpang Lima Blog - Official Blog
 slisskool - Alumni connection

Secondary schools in Malaysia
Schools in Selangor
Educational institutions established in 1983
1983 establishments in Malaysia